Xangati, Inc is an American-based private company headquartered in San Jose, California. Xangati provides service assurance analytics software for enterprises and service providers that operate in virtualized data centers and hybrid cloud environments. The company has a development center in Pune, India. Xangati was acquired by Virtual Instruments for an undisclosed amount in November 2016.

History
In 2006, Xangati was founded by Jagan Jagannathan and Vasu Vasudevan. The mission of the organization was to create efficient IT management softwares that could respond to the dynamic nature of cloud and virtualization environments. The word Xangati is derived from the Sanskrit word "Sangathi", which means "coming together to know more about ourselves."

Xangati's initial focus was on physical network performance management wherein Xangati's real-time and highly scalable approach addressed emerging needs of CSPs and NSPs as they dealt with the expanding number of IPv4 and IPv6 endpoints.

In 2011, Xangati refocused on performance management for enterprise virtualized environments and partnered with Calix to resell its physical network performance management offerings.

Products
The company provides software to track the performance of the virtual and physical infrastructure components in an IT environment. Xangati software collects application-level metrics from VMware vSphere and Microsoft Hyper-V about users and analyzes it. The software also finds data contention storms that can negatively affect the performance of virtualized applications. Data monitoring and predictive analysis for Citrix and VMware VDI environments is also available from the company. This software provides detailed tracking of infrastructure components that affect VDI end-user experiences.

In addition, software to gather metrics from HTTP, HTML and CSS Web Servers about end-users and their applications is developed by Xangati. Once the data has been collected, it can be correlated with metrics collected from the IT infrastructure. Furthermore, Xangati develops a network suite to provide a visual overview of the networks inside a datacenter.

See also
 Performance management
 Virtualization
 Virtual Desktop Infrastructure
 Virtual Machine
 Storage Hypervisor
 Application Virtualization
 User Environment Management

References

External links
 Real-Time Remediation: Enhancing the Value of Virtual ADCs by Integrating Performance Data Analytics
 SaaS Monitoring Service for IT, Operations and Development Podcast with Atchison Frazer and Julian Box

Software appliances
Software companies based in California
Defunct software companies of the United States